is a railway station on the Yamada Line in the city of Miyako, Iwate, Japan, operated by East Japan Railway Company (JR East).

Lines
Hakoishi Station is served by the Yamada Line, and is located 65.7 rail kilometers from the terminus of the line at Morioka Station.

Station layout
Hakoishi Station has a single side platform serving a single bi-directional track. The station is unattended.

History
Hakoishi Station opened on 30 November 1933. The station was closed from 26 November 1946 to 21 November 1954. The station was absorbed into the JR East network upon the privatization of the Japanese National Railways (JNR) on 1 April 1987.

Surrounding area
  Japan National Route 106

See also
 List of railway stations in Japan

References

External links

  

Railway stations in Iwate Prefecture
Yamada Line (JR East)
Railway stations in Japan opened in 1933
Miyako, Iwate
Stations of East Japan Railway Company